Chand Mohammad is an Indian politician. He was elected as MLA of Bhagabangola Vidhan Sabha Constituency in 2006 and 2011. He is an All India Trinamool Congress politician.

References

Living people
Trinamool Congress politicians from West Bengal
West Bengal MLAs 2006–2011
West Bengal MLAs 2011–2016
1967 births